The 2016 Drake Bulldogs football team represented Drake University as a member of the Pioneer Football League (PFL) during 2016 NCAA Division I FCS football season. Led by third-year head coach Rick Fox, the Bulldogs compiled an overall record of 7–4 with a mark of 6–2 in conference play, placing third in the PFL. The team played its home games at Drake Stadium in Des Moines, Iowa.

Schedule

Game summaries

Quincy

@ South Dakota State

McKendree

Morehead State

@ Dayton

@ Valparaiso

San Diego

Campbell

@ Jacksonville

Butler

@ Stetson

References

Drake
Drake Bulldogs football seasons
Drake Bulldogs football